Eugene George Oliver (March 22, 1935 – March 3, 2007) was an American professional baseball player who appeared in 786 games in Major League Baseball, primarily as a catcher and first baseman, between  and , for the St. Louis Cardinals (1959, 1961–63), Milwaukee / Atlanta Braves (1963–67), Philadelphia Phillies (1967), Boston Red Sox (1968) and Chicago Cubs (1968–69).

Biography
Oliver was from Moline, Illinois. He graduated from Alleman Catholic High School and Northwestern University, before signing with the Cardinals in 1956. Oliver had a strong arm and was good at blocking the plate. As a batter, he had some power and decent speed for a catcher.

In , Oliver reached a high-career mark of 21 home runs with the Braves in their final season in Milwaukee, enabling the 1965 Braves to set a National League record with six 20-HR hitters in one season. On June 8 of that year, Joe Torre, Eddie Mathews, Hank Aaron and Oliver hit tenth-inning home runs in a Braves victory over the Cubs, setting a major league record for most long balls in a single inning of an extra-inning game.

The Phillies and Braves switched catchers in 1967, with Bob Uecker going to Atlanta. After the trade, Oliver suffered a severe knee injury that shortened his career.

In his ten-season career, Oliver hit .246 with 93 home runs, 320 runs batted in, 268 runs scored, 111 doubles, five triples, and 24 stolen bases in 786 games.

Oliver remained close to his former Cubs teammates and acted as social director for Randy Hundley's fantasy baseball camps. He died shortly after his 25th camp in Rock Island, Illinois, and is interred at Calvary Mausoleum in Rock Island.

References

External links

Gene Oliver at SABR (Baseball BioProject)
Gene Oliver at Baseballbiography.com

1935 births
2007 deaths
Albany Cardinals players
Ardmore Cardinals players
Atlanta Braves players
Baseball players from Illinois
Boston Red Sox players
Chicago Cubs players
Major League Baseball catchers
Major League Baseball first basemen
Major League Baseball left fielders
Milwaukee Braves players
Northwestern Wildcats baseball players
People from Moline, Illinois
Philadelphia Phillies players
Portland Beavers players
Rochester Red Wings players
St. Louis Cardinals players
San Antonio Missions players
Winston-Salem Cardinals players
Northwestern Wildcats football players